Para Polla (Greek: Πάρα Πολλά; English: Too many) is the title of the thirteenth studio album by the popular Greek artist Peggy Zina, released on 13 November 2015 by Minos EMI in Greece and Cyprus.

Track listing

Music videos
 "Moni Kardia"
 "Me Tin Plati Ston Toiho"
 "Ela Grigora"

Release history

Charts

References

2015 albums
Greek-language albums
Peggy Zina albums
Minos EMI albums